, there were about 4,200 electric vehicles registered in New Mexico. , 1.7% of new vehicles sold in the state were electric.

Government policy
, the state government does not offer any tax incentives for electric vehicle purchases.

The first electric vehicles were added to the state fleet in 2019.

Charging stations
, there were about 250 public charging stations in New Mexico.

The Infrastructure Investment and Jobs Act, signed into law in November 2021, allocates  to charging stations in New Mexico.

Public opinion
A poll conducted in November 2021 by Coltura shows 51% of New Mexico voters in support of requiring all new cars sold in the state to be electric by 2030.

By region

Albuquerque
, there were about 60 public charging stations in Albuquerque.

Santa Fe
, there were about 30 public charging stations in Santa Fe.

References

New Mexico
Road transportation in New Mexico